The Wilhelmshaven World War II bombings by the Allies of World War II destroyed targets at Wilhelmshaven in Germany. From spring 1943 until November 1943 slave labourers of the SS-Baubrigade II from the Neuengamme concentration camp were transferred to Wilhelmshaven to clear up after air raids.

References

Oil campaign of World War II
Wilhelmshaven
Germany–United Kingdom military relations